Lester Alexander Auge (May 16, 1953 – September 20, 2002) was an American ice hockey defenseman who appeared in a total of six National Hockey League regular season games with the Colorado Rockies in 1980–81 but spent most of his career in the minor leagues. He was born in St. Paul, Minnesota. Auge was signed as a free agent by the Rockies after playing for the United States team at the 1979 Ice Hockey World Championship tournament as well as the University of Minnesota men's hockey team.

Career statistics

Regular season and playoffs

International

Awards and honors

In popular culture
In the 1981 made-for-TV movie Miracle on Ice, Auge was portrayed by Jerry Houser.

References

External links

Obituary at LostHockey.com

1953 births
2002 deaths
AHCA Division I men's ice hockey All-Americans
American men's ice hockey defensemen
Colorado Rockies (NHL) players
Dayton Gems players
Fort Worth Texans players
Hershey Bears players
Ice hockey people from Saint Paul, Minnesota
NCAA men's ice hockey national champions
Minnesota Golden Gophers men's ice hockey players
Oklahoma City Stars players
Port Huron Flags players
Rochester Americans players
Undrafted National Hockey League players